Pocket Hercules may refer to:
 Naim Süleymanoğlu (1967-2017), Bulgarian-born Turkish World and Olympic Champion in weightlifting
 Maurice Jones-Drew (born 1985), American football player 
 Darren Sproles (born 1983), American football player 
 Manohar Aich (1912–2016), Indian bodybuilder